The Atlantic 10 Conference men's basketball tournament is the conference championship tournament in men's basketball for the Atlantic 10 Conference (A-10). The tournament has been held every year since 1977. It is a single-elimination tournament, and seeding is based on regular season records. The winner, declared conference champion, receives the conference's automatic bid to the NCAA men's basketball tournament.

Tournament champions

By school

†Former member of the Atlantic 10

See also
 Atlantic 10 women's basketball tournament

References 

 
Recurring sporting events established in 1977